Lepidopleurus is an extant genus of chitons in the family Leptochitonidae.

Species
 
 Lepidopleurus cajetanus (Poli, 1791)

 Lepidopleurus fairchildi Iredale & Hull, 1929
 Lepidopleurus finlayi (Ashby, 1929)
 Lepidopleurus inquinatus (Reeve, 1847)
 Lepidopleurus otagoensis Iredale & Hull, 1929
 Lepidopleurus pergranatus

References

 
 Powell A. W. B., New Zealand Mollusca, William Collins Publishers Ltd, Auckland, New Zealand 1979 

Leptochitonidae
Paleocene first appearances
Chiton genera